Ellen Akins is an American novelist from South Bend, Indiana.

Early life and education 
After graduating from LaSalle Intermediate Academy in 1977, Akins earned a Bachelor of Arts in film production at the University of Southern California. As a young adult, Akins participated in Beyond Our Control, a youth-produced community television program.

Career 
Akins worked with film producer Sydney Pollack before losing interest in the film business. Akins then earned a Master of Fine Arts in the creative writing program at Johns Hopkins University. In April 1993, she was awarded the Academy Award of the American Academy of Arts and Letters for her fiction writing; she has also been given grants by the National Endowment for the Arts and the Ingram Merrill Foundation, and won the Whiting Award in 1989.

Akins is the author of five books; the novels Home Movie, published in 1988 by Simon & Schuster, Little Woman, published in 1990 by Harper & Row, Public Life, published in 1993 by HarperCollins, and Hometown Brew, published by Alfred A. Knopf in 1998, and the short story collection "World Like a Knife", published in 1991 by Johns Hopkins University Press. Akins has also taught at Western Michigan University, Northland College, and Fairleigh Dickinson University.

Personal life 
Akins lives in Cornucopia, Wisconsin.

Awards 
1989 Whiting Award
1993 Academy Award from the American Academy of Arts and Letters

Works

Books

Stories

References

External links 
Profile at The Whiting Foundation

Writers from South Bend, Indiana
Western Michigan University faculty
Northland College (Wisconsin)
Fairleigh Dickinson University faculty
20th-century American novelists
American women novelists
Living people
USC School of Cinematic Arts alumni
Johns Hopkins University alumni
20th-century American women writers
Novelists from New Jersey
Novelists from Indiana
Novelists from Michigan
Year of birth missing (living people)
American women academics
21st-century American women